2016 Regional League Division 2 Central Region is the 1st season of the League competition since its establishment in 2016. It is in the third tier of the Thai football league system. The league winners and runners up will qualify for the 2016 Regional League Division 2 champions league round. This zone is broken from 2015 Thai Division 2 League Central & Eastern Region and 2015 Thai Division 2 League Central & Western Region

Changes from Last Season

Break zone Clubs

PTU Pathum Thani Seeker is broken from Central & Western Region
Saraburi TRU and Phan Thong are broken from Central & Eastern Region

Relegated Clubs

 Ayutthaya were relegated from the 2015 Thai Division 1 League.

Moved Clubs

Chaiyaphum were moved from the North Eastern Region.
Nakhon Sawan, Singburi and Uthai Thani Forest were moved from the Northern Region.
 Phichit  were moved from the Northern Region.

Expansion Clubs
 Ayutthaya United Promoted from Khǒr Royal Cup (ถ้วย ข.) runner-up 2015
 Ayutthaya Warrior authorize from   Phichit.

Renamed Clubs
Kaeng Khoi TRU renamed Saraburi TRU
PTU Pathum Thani Seeker renamed PTU Pathum Thani

Returning Clubs

Paknampho NSRU and Uthai Thani Forest are returning to the league after a 1-year break.

Stadium and locations

League table

Results

Season statistics

Top scorers
As of 3 September 2016.

Attendances

See also
 2016 Thai Premier League
 2016 Thai Division 1 League
 2016 Regional League Division 2
 2016 Thai FA Cup
 2016 Thai League Cup
 2016 Kor Royal Cup

References

External links
 Division 2

2016 in Thai football leagues